Dicranoloma menziesii is a species of moss. It grows in moist situations on the coast and tablelands of eastern Australia. As well as Lord Howe Island, the Juan Fernandez Islands and southern areas of South America. It also may be found in moist forests of New Zealand, on trunks of trees or in mats on the forest floor. Leaves are narrow and falcate in shape, with tapering leaves resembling grass.

References

Dicranales
Plants described in 1844
Flora of Australia
Flora of New Zealand
Flora of Lord Howe Island
Flora of South America